King Kang may refer to:
King Kang of Zhou (r. 1020–996 BC), king of the Zhou Dynasty
King Kang of Chu (r. 559–545 BC), king of the State of Chu

See also
Duke Kang (disambiguation)